Marjorie Williams (January 13, 1958 – January 16, 2005) was an American writer, reporter, and columnist for Vanity Fair and The Washington Post, writing about American society and profiling the American "political elite."

Life and career
Williams was born in Princeton, New Jersey, to a scientist-turned-homemaker mother and a father who was an editorial director at Viking Press. After attending Harvard for two years, Williams dropped out in her junior year and moved to New York to work in publishing. Williams had a flair for the business but preferred to go into journalism, and in 1986 she got a job as an editor for The Washington Post.

A year later she became a reporter for the paper's "Style" section. Williams' deft political profiles were an immediate success and eventually she branched out to Vanity Fair, covering everyone from Bill Clinton to Barbara Bush to Colin Powell as well as penning profiles of her own struggles and foibles. She was also a member of Slate book club, a group of writers who regularly paired off to conduct online dialogs about recently-published fiction and nonfiction, and contributed occasional book reviews to the Washington Monthly. In 2000 Williams became an op-ed columnist for the Post. A year and a half later, she was diagnosed with liver cancer; in spite of being told she only had a few months left, Williams lived for more than three years. Her final Post column, written in November 2004, focused on her young daughter's Halloween costume. In June 2011 the National Society of Newspaper Columnists named it one of the top 15 newspaper columns in American history.

Williams died on January 16, 2005, three days after her 47th birthday. She was survived by her stepmother, three sisters, her husband Timothy Noah (of Politico), and her two children. Her ashes were buried in Rock Creek Cemetery near the Adams Memorial.

In November 2005 a posthumous collection of Williams's writings, edited by Noah, was published under the title The Woman at the Washington Zoo. The book won PEN American Center's Martha Albrand Award For First Nonfiction and a National Magazine Award in the category of essays and criticism. The latter was for a previously unpublished essay in the book about Williams' experiences as a cancer patient, a shorter version of which appeared in Vanity Fair prior to the book's publication. A second anthology, Reputation: Portraits in Power was published in October 2008.

References

External links
 Slate obituary
 Selection of Washington Post columns
 Selection of Slate articles
 Selection of Vanity Fair articles
 Selection of Washington Monthly articles
 Uncollected articles and columns
 Interview on C-Span, June 2001

1958 births
2005 deaths
Harvard University alumni
Deaths from cancer in Washington, D.C.
Deaths from liver cancer
American columnists
The Washington Post journalists
Vanity Fair (magazine) people
People from Princeton, New Jersey
American women columnists
20th-century American women
21st-century American women
Burials at Rock Creek Cemetery